John M. Greaney (born April 8, 1939) is a former Associate Justice of the Massachusetts Supreme Judicial Court and former Chief Justice of the Massachusetts Appeals Court.  After his judicial retirement, he served as Director of the Macaronis Institute for Trial and Appellate Advocacy at Suffolk University Law School.  He currently is in private practice as senior counsel at Bulkley Richardson in Springfield, Massachusetts.

John Greaney was born in Westfield, Massachusetts, on April 8, 1939.  He graduated from St Mary's High School, the College of the Holy Cross, and received a law degree from New York University School of Law. After briefly serving in the military, Chief Justice Greaney joined the Springfield law firm of Ely and King until his appointment to the Hampden County Housing Court in 1974.

Greaney served as presiding judge in the Housing Court until Governor Michael Dukakis appointed him to the Superior Court in 1975, then to the Appeals Court in 1978.  He served as an associate justice until 1984, when he became the Appeals Court's chief justice.  In 1989, Greaney was appointed to the Supreme Judicial Court, where he served until his retirement in 2008.  In his time on the bench, he wrote a well-known concurrence in Goodridge v. Department of Public Health. In 2008, Justice Greaney retired from the court and was appointed director of the Macaronis Institute for Trial and Appellate Advocacy at Suffolk University Law School in Boston.

References

 Massachusetts Lawyers Weekly, Massachusetts Judicial Profiles 

1939 births
Living people
People from Westfield, Massachusetts
College of the Holy Cross alumni
New York University School of Law alumni
Justices of the Massachusetts Supreme Judicial Court
Judges of the Massachusetts Appeals Court